The  Stanley Norman  is a Chesapeake Bay skipjack, built in 1902 by Otis Lloyd, Salisbury, Maryland.

Stanley Norman is one of the 35 surviving traditional Chesapeake Bay skipjacks and was a member of the last commercial sailing fleet in the United States. The vessel was extensively rebuilt, renovated and the process documented from 1976 ti 1980. In 1990 the vessel was sold to the Chesapeake Bay Foundation and is based in Annapolis, Maryland used as a teaching vessel. On December 9, 2003, a fire in the cabin caused some damage, though there was no major damage.

The vessel was based in Annapolis at either Annapolis City Dock near the Annapolis Summer Garden Theatre (as pictured) or the Annapolis Maritime Museum and also operated from the Chesapeake Bay Maritime Museum in St. Michaels, Talbot County, Maryland. The teaching program aboard covered history and present issues of the Chesapeake, including the life of the Bay's waterman, and allowed participants to dredge for oysters and conduct water quality tests.
The Stanley Norman was retired from the Chesapeake Bay Foundations Fleet in the Summer of 2020. On May 9, 2022 the "Stanley Norman" was purchased by RDC Inn at Perry Cabin LLC and now resides at Inn at Perry Cabin resort along the Miles River in St. Michaels Maryland. 

She was listed on the National Register of Historic Places in 1985. She is assigned Maryland dredge number 60, and was previously dredge 20.

Footnotes

References

External links
 Stanley Norman docked at the Annapolis Maritime Museum (Photo and article)
Stern view photo with tender at Annapolis Maritime Museum
 "My Time Aboard Skipjacks" by Michael A. Rawl
, including photo in 1983, at Maryland Historical Trust

Tourist attractions in Annapolis, Maryland
Ships in Talbot County, Maryland
Skipjacks
Ships on the National Register of Historic Places in Maryland
1902 ships
National Register of Historic Places in Talbot County, Maryland